The Earth System Research Laboratories (ESRL) is an alliance of four NOAA scientific labs, all located in the David Skaggs Research Center on the Department of Commerce campus in Boulder, Colorado. Organized under NOAA’s Office of Oceanic and Atmospheric Research, ESRL scientists pursue cutting-edge research around the world to continually advance scientific understanding of weather, climate, air quality, water resources, and other components of the Earth system.

The four labs’ intersecting missions have generated an extraordinary legacy of accomplishment over the past 50 years. Backed by scientists from cooperative research institutes at the University of Colorado and Colorado State University, ESRL has been an engine of scientific discovery, producing environmental models and products, along with forecasting and decision-support tools to protect life and safety, and support commerce at local to global scales. 

Together with its university partners and the nearby National Center for Atmospheric Research, ESRL has helped Boulder earn a reputation as one of the premier global centers for atmospheric research.

Laboratories 
The Chemical Sciences Laboratory (CSL) advances scientific understanding of the chemical and physical processes that affect Earth’s atmospheric composition and climate. 

The Global Monitoring Laboratory (GML) researches greenhouse gas and carbon cycle feedbacks, changes in clouds, aerosols, and surface radiation, and the recovery of stratospheric ozone.

The Global Systems Laboratory (GSL) Develops next-generation weather forecast models, decision support tools, visualization systems, and uses high-performance computing technology to support a Weather-Ready Nation.

The Physical Sciences Laboratory (PSL) conducts weather, climate and hydrologic research to effectively anticipate and respond to the challenges of hydrologic extremes.

History 
On October 1, 2005, NOAA's Aeronomy Laboratory, Climate Diagnostics Center, Climate Monitoring and Diagnostics Laboratory, Environmental Technology Laboratory, and Forecast Systems Laboratory were merged into four divisions of the newly-formed Earth System Research Laboratory. These were the Chemical Sciences Division, Global Monitoring Division, Global Systems Division, and Physical Sciences Division.

On April 2, 2020, NOAA designated the four divisions of the Earth System Research Laboratory in Boulder as full laboratories within the NOAA Oceanic and Atmospheric Research line office to meet recent shifts in mission-essential priorities. The four laboratories retained their core research missions, and continue to collaborate closely with each other and other NOAA Research laboratories to improve understanding and ability to predict changes in Earth’s atmosphere, climate and weather.

References

External links
 

Office of Oceanic and Atmospheric Research
Climate change organizations based in the United States
Earth system sciences